Edinburgh East and Musselburgh was a constituency of the House of Commons of the Parliament of the United Kingdom (at Westminster) from 1997 to 2005. It elected one Member of Parliament (MP) by the first past the post system of election.

In 1999, a Scottish Parliament constituency was created with the same name and boundaries, and continued in use until 2011. See Edinburgh East and Musselburgh (Scottish Parliament constituency).

Boundaries
Electoral divisions 27 (Meadowbank/Mountcastle), 28 (Links/Restalrig), 29 (Portobello/Milton), 38 (Craigmillar/Duddingston) in City of Edinburgh District; electoral division 44 (Musselburgh/Fisherrow) in East Lothian District.

The constituency covered an eastern portion of the City of Edinburgh council area and a Musselburgh area within the East Lothian council area. It was one of six constituencies covering the City of Edinburgh area, and one of two covering the East Lothian area. The constituency was predominantly urban.

For the 2005 general election, most of the constituency was merged into the new Edinburgh East constituency. The rest of the constituency, the Musselburgh area, was merged into the East Lothian constituency.

Members of Parliament

Election results

Elections of the 2000s

Elections of the 1990s

See also
 Politics of Edinburgh

Notes and references

East and Musselburgh
Historic parliamentary constituencies in Scotland (Westminster)
Constituencies of the Parliament of the United Kingdom established in 1997
Constituencies of the Parliament of the United Kingdom disestablished in 2005
Musselburgh